Collas is a surname. Notable people with this surname include:

 Achille Collas (1795–1859), French engineer, inventor, writer and engraver
 Berni Collas (1954–2010), Belgian politician
 J. P. Collas
 Jean Collas (1874–1928), French rugby union player
 John von Collas (1678–1753), French architect
 Louis Antoine Collas (1775–1829), French painter
 Philippe Collas, French writer and scriptwriter
 Richard Collas
 Silvia Collas (born 1974), Bulgarian-French chess player